The Top Model of the World is an
international search for the ultimate model. The event started in 1993 in Miami, organised by the Globana Group. It is now owned and managed by the World Beauty Organization.

The current Top Model of the World for 2023 is Mariana Macias from Mexico.

Winners

 Natália Guimarães, winner of the 2006 edition, resigned her title as she represented Brazil in Miss Universe 2007. She was replaced by Michele de Leon (Philippines) and 1st runner-up.

By number of wins

List of runners-up

Continental Top Model

See also
 List of beauty contests

References

Further reading
 "Malaika heads for Miss Top Model of the World". News Day.
 
 "Pushpika Sandamali brimming with confidence". Sunday Observer
 
 
 
 
 
 
 

 
2010 beauty pageants
2011 beauty pageants
International beauty pageants